Angel Wanjiru Ngugi (born 2003) is a Kenyan musician,  born with a congenital disorder called hydrocephalus. On 16 December 2019, she received the Founders Award at MTM Choice Awards in the United Kingdom.

Biography 
Wanjiru was born in 2003, with a congenital disorder called hydrocephalus. Her mother is Anne Ngugi, a Kenyan BBC presenter. As a result of her condition, she has a bigger head than other people. Her condition exposes her to a lot of bullying, ridicule and health problems. However, she released her first song called Nataka Jua, (meaning, I want to know)  in 2016 and produced her first album at the age of 14.

Discography 

 Nataka Jua (2016)
 Story of My Life ( 2019)

Collaborative songs 

 Niko sawa with Audrey
Moyo Safi with Anne Ngugi and Denno
Typu Yako Mungu Hakuna with Anne Ngugi

Awards 

 2019 - She won the Against All Odds Category of the Voice Achievers Award
2019 - She received the Founders Award at MTM Choice Awards in the United Kingdom

References

Living people
Kenyan musicians
Kenyan women musicians
2003 births